Dom Lustosa  is a neighborhood in the western zone of Fortaleza–CE, in the Northeast Region of Brazil, which is part of the Regional Executive Office III.

The neighborhood is delimited by the Alagadiço Creek in the north, the Senador Fernandes Tavora Avenue in the south, the Coronel Matos Dourado Avenue in the east and the Cardeal Arcoverde, bordering Autran Nunes, in the west. There are two private schools; named for Fernão Dias and Getúlio Vargas, and four public schools, Justiniano de Serpa, Ayrton Senna, Paulo Freire and Waldemar Alcantara.

Photos gallery

References

Neighbourhoods in Fortaleza